Jihad: The Rise of Militant Islam in Central Asia is a 2002 non-fiction book written by Ahmed Rashid.

Overview
Non-fiction book about the rise of militant Islam in Central Asia.

Author 
At the time of writing the book, Ahmed Rashid was a columnist for the New York Times.

Popular success 
A best-seller.

Readership 
Former punk rock musician Henry Rollins was considered a person of interest and questioned by Australian anti-terrorism officials after a fellow passenger reported him for reading Jihad on a flight from Auckland to Melbourne in 2006.

References

2002 non-fiction books
Books about Islamic fundamentalism
Non-fiction books about jihadism
Books about Central Asia